The Marj Mitchell Sportsmanship Award is the sportsmanship award at the annual Scotties Tournament of Hearts, held to crown the Canadian women's curling championship.  When Scott Paper took over sponsorship of the Canadian Women's Curling Championship in 1982, they decided to present an annual award for sportsmanship.  From 1982 to 1997, the award had a different name each year, as the convention was to name the annual award after an individual from the host region who exemplified sportsmanship and dedication to curling.  In 1998, the decision was made to honour Marj Mitchell each year.  Mitchell curled for Saskatchewan and captured the national and world championships in 1982.  Mitchell died of cancer in 1983.

Scotties Tournament of Hearts Sportsmanship Award winners prior to 1998
Prior to 1998, the Sportsmanship award at the Scotties Tournament of Hearts was named after a notable individual in the curling community where the tournament was held that year.

Winners of the Marj Mitchell Sportsmanship Award
Starting in 1998, the Sportsmanship Award at the annual Scotties Tournament of Hearts was permanently renamed the Marj Mitchell Sportsmanship Award in honour of Mitchell, a Saskatchewan curler who died of cancer in 1983.

References

Awards established in 1982
Scotties Tournament of Hearts
Women's curling in Canada
1982 establishments in Canada
Sportsmanship trophies and awards
Curling trophies and awards